The Micronoctuini are a tribe of moths in the family Erebidae that includes about 400 described species. Typical species in the tribe have bifine hindwing venation (unlike most of the related subfamily Hypenodinae) and are smaller than those in other noctuoid moths. Micronoctua karsholti is the smallest of all species in the superfamily Noctuoidea.

Taxonomic history
Before the initial description of the tribe as the family Micronoctuidae in 2005, about 20 species were described in the families Arctiidae (now Arctiinae), Noctuidae, Nolidae (now Nolinae) and Pyralidae. The first species now referable to the tribe were named by Walker in 1863. Species of this tribe are rare in collections, possibly because most species are drably coloured (often a unicolorous brown, grey, or black) and are extremely small. Furthermore, lepidopterists specialising in macrolepidoptera ignore these species, thinking they belong to the microlepidoptera instead, while microlepidopterists collect them but usually classify them with unknown miscellaneous microlepidoptera.

An extensive, four-part revision of the Micronoctuidae was published by Michael Fibiger from 2007 to 2011 (see References section), describing dozens of species for their first time and classifying them into subfamilies and tribes. A subsequent series of studies of the higher-level classification of the superfamily Noctuoidea showed that the phylogenetic placement of Micronoctuidae is as a clade within the subfamily Hypenodinae of the family Erebidae. This reclassification moved Micronoctuidae to the tribe Micronoctuini, its subfamilies to subtribes, and presumably its original tribes to infratribes.

Distribution
The Micronoctuini are only known from the Old World, mainly in the tropics and subtropics, but also in the temperate zone of eastern Asia. They inhabit many different biotopes, including sand deserts, stone deserts, semi-deserts, grass steppes, bush steppes, steppes with bushes and trees, savannah, open dry forests, dense dry forests, moist always deciduous forests and rainforests. They are found from Sierra Leone in Africa to Vanuatu in the Pacific and from the Russian Far East to Cape Town in South Africa and northern New South Wales in Australia.

Subtribes (former subfamilies)
Belluliina Fibiger, 2008
Magnina Fibiger, 2008
Micronoctuina Fibiger, 2005
Parachrostiina Fibiger, 2008
Pollexina Fibiger, 2007
Tactusina Fibiger, 2010
Tentaxina Fibiger, 2011

References 

 
Hypenodinae
Moth tribes